India has many Naxalite and Maoist groups.

List 

Communist Party of India (Marxist-Leninist) Red Star led by K.N.Ramachandran
Centre of Indian Communists
Communist Ghadar Party of India
Communist Party of India (Maoist) led by Nambala Keshava Rao—result of the September 2004 merger of the Maoist Communist Centre of India (M.C.C.) and the Communist Party of India (Marxist-Leninist) People's War, also known as the People's War Group (PWG)
Communist League of India (Marxist-Leninist) 
Communist Party of Bharat led by Ranjan Chakraborty and Barnali Mukherjee
Communist Party of India (Marxist-Leninist) Naxalbari led by Rauf
Communist Party of India (Marxist-Leninist) Janashakti led by Koora Rajanna
Communist Party of India (Marxist-Leninist) Janashakti led by Ranadheer
Communist Party of India (Marxist-Leninist) Janashakti led by Chandra Pulla Reddy
Communist Party of India (Marxist-Leninist) Bhaijee
Communist Party of India (Marxist-Leninist) Prajashakti
Communist Party of India (Marxist-Leninist) Praja Pratighatana
Communist Party of India (Marxist-Leninist) Prathighatana
Communist Party of India (Marxist-Leninist) (Mahadev Mukherjee) led by Mahadev Mukherjee
Communist Party of India (Marxist-Leninist) Central Team
Communist Party of India (Marxist-Leninist) (Kanu Sanyal) led by Kanu Sanyal
Communist Party of India (Marxist–Leninist) Liberation led by Dipankar Bhattacharya
Communist Party of India (Marxist-Leninist) Red Flag led by Unnichekkan
Communist Party of India (Marxist-Leninist) New Democracy led by Yatendra Kumar
Communist Party of India (Marxist-Leninist) Somnath led by Somnath Chatterjee Ukhra and Pradip Banerjee
Communist Party of India (Marxist-Leninist) Shantipal
Communist Party of India (Marxist-Leninist) Jan Samvad
Communist Party of India (Marxist-Leninist) Nai Pahal
Communist Party of India (Marxist-Leninist) New Proletarian
Communist Party of India (Marxist-Leninist) Maharashtra
Communist Party of India (Marxist-Leninist) Organizing Committee
Communist Party of United States of India
Communist Revolutionary Centre
Provisional Central Committee, Communist Party of India (Marxist-Leninist) led by Satyanarayan Singh and Santosh Rana
Communist Party Reorganization Centre of India (Marxist-Leninist)
Marxist-Leninist Committee led by K. Venkateswar Rao
Re-organizing Committee, Communist League of India (Marxist-Leninist)
Revolutionary Communist Centre of India (Marxist-Leninist-Maoist)
Revolutionary Socialist Party of India (Marxist-Leninist)
Revolutionary Communist Unity Centre (Marxist-Leninist)
Lal Jhanda Dal
Unity Centre of Communist Revolutionaries of India (Marxist-Leninist) (D.V. Rao)
Unity Centre of Communist Revolutionaries of India (Marxist-Leninist) (Ajmer group)
Maoist Communist Party of Manipur

See also
List of communist parties in India

List
Naxalite and Maoist
Naxalite and Maoist